Nina Polan (born Janina Katelbach; November 30, 1927 – February 16, 2014) was a Polish actress and theatre director active in the United States.

Since 1984 Nina Polan was executive and artistic director of the Polish Theatre Institute in America.

She was a daughter of Polish politician Tadeusz Katelbach (1897–1977).

Filmography 
 1982: Sophie's Choice as Woman in English Class
 1999: Fever as Polish Women Witness
 2003: Love & Stuff as Mrs. Galway
 2005: Solidarity as Meat Shop Babushka
 2010: Occupant as Lily Wainwright
 2014: Wolfenstein: The New Order as Olenka Targonski
 2014: A Walk Among the Tombstones as Old Woman

Awards and decorations
Knight's Cross of the Order of Merit of the Republic of Poland
Silver Medal of the "Wspolnota Polska" Association
Golden Medal for Merit to Culture – Gloria Artis

References

External links

1927 births
2014 deaths
Polish emigrants to the United States
Polish film actresses
Polish stage actresses
American stage actresses
American film actresses
Alumni of RADA
21st-century American women